Rodina Geroya is a rural locality (a khutor) in Stepnyanskoye Rural Settlement, Olkhovatsky District, Voronezh Oblast, Russia. The population was 123 as of 2010. There are 4 streets.

Geography 
Rodina Geroya is located 22 km southwest of Olkhovatka (the district's administrative centre) by road. Nerovnovka is the nearest rural locality.

References 

Rural localities in Olkhovatsky District